Haustor (German for house door) was a Yugoslav rock band from Zagreb, SR Croatia, a member of the new wave movement, and an important act of the former Yugoslav rock scene.

History 
The basis of the band was formed in 1977, when singer and occasional guitarist Darko Rundek met bassist Srđan Sacher. Two years later they formed Haustor, together with Ozren Štiglić (guitar) and Boris Leiner (drums), who also played in another prominent Yugoslav rock band Azra. During 1980 they added Zoran Vuletić (keyboard) and a brass section. The group was mostly influenced by Caribbean music.

Haustor released its self-titled debut album in 1981. All of the songs were written by either Sacher or Rundek. Sacher's reggae song "Moja prva ljubav" (My First Love) became a hit, and it still remains popular in the former Yugoslav countries.

After a pause, which was caused by the members' conscription in the former Yugoslav People's Army, their second album, titled Treći svijet (Third World), was released in 1984. However, soon afterwards Sacher left the band, leaving Rundek as the sole composer and lyricist of the band.

Haustor released two more albums, Bolero (1985) and Tajni grad (1988), before breaking up in 1990. The group gathered again during the 1990s for a temporary reunion and later finally disbanded.

The group is featured in the 2003 Croatian rockumentary Sretno dijete along several other eminent former Yugoslav new wave artists.

A cover version of their song "Moja prva ljubav" in Polish is included in the 2001 tribute album Yugoton.

Discography

Studio albums 
 Haustor (1981)
 Treći svijet (1984)
 Bolero (1985)
 Tajni grad (1988)

Compilation albums 
 1981. 1984. 1985. 1988. (1995)
 Platinum Collection (2007)
 The Ultimate Collection (2008)
 The Ultimate Haustor Collection (2009)

Live albums 
 Ulje je na vodi (1995)

Singles 
 "Moja prva ljubav / Pogled u BB" (1981)
 "Radio / Crni žbir" (1981)
 "Zima / Majmuni i mjesec / Capri" (1981)
 "Ena" / "Take the Money and Run" (1985)

Other appearances 
 Svi marš na ples! (1981)
 Vrući dani i vrele noći (1982)

References

Further reading
 EX YU ROCK enciklopedija 1960-2006, Janjatović Petar; 

 

Croatian rock music groups
Croatian new wave musical groups
Croatian post-punk music groups
Yugoslav rock music groups
Musicians from Zagreb